José Ezequiel D'Angelo (born 5 April 1989) is an Argentine professional footballer who plays as a midfielder for Bolivian Primera División club Bolívar.

Career
D'Angelo was born in Quilmes Buenos Aires, Argentina. He trialled Manchester City in 2011.

Teams
 Chacarita Juniors 2010–2011
 Central Español 2011
 Rangers 2012
 Bolívar 2013–present

References

External links
 
 

1989 births
Living people
People from Quilmes
Sportspeople from Buenos Aires Province
Argentine footballers
Association football midfielders
Central Español players
Club Bolívar players
Rangers de Talca footballers
Chacarita Juniors footballers
Chilean Primera División players
Argentine expatriate footballers
Argentine expatriate sportspeople in Chile
Expatriate footballers in Chile
Argentine expatriate sportspeople in Bolivia
Expatriate footballers in Bolivia
Argentine expatriate sportspeople in Uruguay
Expatriate footballers in Uruguay